Lebel is a surname.

Lebel may also refer to:

 Lebel Model 1886 rifle
 8mm Lebel (8×50mmR French) cartridge used in the Lebel rifle
 Modèle 1892 revolver, often referred to as the Lebel M1892
 The 8×27mmR Regimetaire Mle 92 cartridge, used in the Modèle 1892, and also known as the 8mm Lebel Revolver and the 8mm French Ord—see 8 mm caliber
 Lebel-sur-Quévillon, a city in the Canadian province of Quebec, located on Route 113 in the Jamésie region